Bouchetia is a genus of flowering plants belonging to the family Solanaceae. Its native range is subtropical America and it is found in the countries of Argentina, Brazil, Guatemala, Mexico, Paraguay, Uruguay and the United States (Texas).

The genus name of Bouchetia is in honour of Dominique Bouchet-Doumenq (1771–1844), French physician and botanist in Montpellier.

Species 

The following species are recognised in the genus Bouchetia:
 Bouchetia anomala (Miers) Britton & Rusby
 Bouchetia erecta DC. ex Dunal
 Bouchetia procumbens DC. ex Dunal

References

Solanaceae
Solanaceae genera